This is a list of famous or notable people born in, or associated with, Sunderland or the wider City of Sunderland in North East England.

Notable people from Sunderland

Arts

 Griselda Allan (1905–1987), artist
 Marion Angus (1865–1946), Scottish poet writing in Scots, born in Sunderland
 James Baxter, actor
 Ernie Lotinga (actor)
 James Bolam (1935–), actor
 Alan Browning  actor, born Alan Brown
 Mary Burchell (1904–1986), novelist, as Ida Cook: WWII heroine ("Righteous among the Nations")
 Bernard Comrie (1947–), linguist
 Terry Deary (1946–), author
 Mike Elliott, comedian, actor and radio presenter
 Edward Gregson, composer
 James Herriot (pen name of James Alfred Wight) (1916–1995), veterinary surgeon and author
 Melanie Hill (1962–), actress
 Nat Jackley, comedian
 Jools Jameson (1968–), game developer
 Bobby Knoxall, comedian
 Gina McKee (1964–), actress 
 Gibb McLaughlin (1884–1960), actor, born George Gibb McLaughlin
 Christine Norden (1924–1988), actress, born Mary Lydia Thornton
 David Parfitt, an Oscar-winning film producer
 Sheila Quigley, novelist
 Ronald Radd (1929–1976), actor
 Callum Keith Rennie (1960–), film and television actor
 Maurice Roëves (1937–2020), actor
 William Russell actor and the first actor of three actors to appear as Doctor Who Companion
 Clarkson Stanfield, painter
 Mary Stewart, novelist
 Tom Taylor, playwright and editor of Punch
Alan Temperley born 1936, children's and young adults author, works include Harry and the Wrinkles, The Deck Boy, Scar Hill.
 Bobby Thompson, comedian, the 'Little Waster'
 William Lindon-Travers, actor, screenwriter, director and animal rights activist, known professionally as Bill Travers
 Graham Wallas, author and academic
 Alison Wright (1976–), actress

Industry
Sir Robert Appleby Bartram (1835–1925), shipbuilder
William Reid Clanny (1770–1850), inventor and physician
 John Cryan (born 1960), banker
 Sir Tom Cowie, entrepreneur and philanthropist
 George Daniels, world-famous horologist and inventor of the co-axial escapement
 Sir Edward Temperley Gourley, coalfitter, shipowner and politician
 Sir William Halcrow, civil engineer
 Thomas Elliott Harrison, railway engineer
 George Burton Hunter, shipbuilder and innovator
 Patrick Meik and Charles Meik, civil engineering brothers 
 Sir William Mills, inventor of the Mills Bomb (hand grenade)
 William Pile, shipbuilder
 Sir Joseph Swan, inventor of the electric light bulb
 Harry Watts, shipyard worker and multiple life-saver

Military and services
Robert Appleby Bartram (1894–1981), colonel and shipbuilder
Gertrude Bell (1868–1926), colonial administrator
 PC Keith Blakelock (1945–1985), police officer
Sir Lawrence Andrew Common (1889–1953), Army officer and shipping director
 Jack Crawford (1775–1831), sailor
 Sir Henry Havelock (1795–1857), Major-General
 Captain Richard Avery Hornsby, navy captain
 Joseph Robert Kayll (1914–2000), WW2 RAF flying Ace
 John Lilburne 'Free-born John', civil war figure
 Alan Parnaby (1916–1974), cricketer and British Army officer
Ernest Vaux (1865–1925), Army Officer and Brewer

Music
 Don Airey, musician, keyboardist with Deep Purple
 Sir Thomas Allen, baritone
 George Bellamy, musician 
 Eric Boswell, songwriter (Little Donkey)
 Mark Brydon, one half of electro outfit Moloko
 Bryan Ferry, singer, musician, and songwriter. Lead singer with Roxy Music
 Muriel Foster, contralto
 Frankie & The Heartstrings, indie rock band
 The Futureheads, indie rock band 
 Eve Gallagher, singer
 Kenickie, 1990s pop band
 Lauren Laverne, ex-lead singer of Kenickie, later radio and TV presenter
 Jez Lowe, folk singer, songwriter and broadcaster
 Bob and Alf Pearson, singers, pianist (Bob) and variety performers
 Alan Price, singer, musician, and songwriter. Keyboard player with The Animals
 Emeli Sandé, musician
 David A. Stewart (1952–), musician and songwriter, most notably as one half of the band Eurythmics
 The Toy Dolls, punk rock band
 Baz Warne, guitarist with The Stranglers

Politics
 Hilary Armstrong, Member of Parliament, Cabinet Office and Social Exclusion Minister, Chancellor of the Duchy of Lancaster, 2006–07
 Sir Theodore Doxford, shipbuilder and politician
 George Hudson, Member of Parliament and railway financier
 Sir Edward Temperley Gourley, coalfitter, shipowner and politician
John Stapylton grey Pemberton (1860–1940), MP and Vice-Chancellor of Durham University
 Jonathan Reynolds, Labour Party MP
 Sir Luke Thompson, coal merchant and politician
 Joseph Havelock Wilson, Trade union leader, Liberal Party politician, and campaigner for the rights of merchant seamen.

Sport
 Charles W. Alcock: Cricketer and Football administrator. 
 Allan Ball (born 1943), ex-professional footballer and now Honorary Director of Queen of the South F.C.
 Paul Kitson, ex-professional footballer
 Clive Mendonca, ex-professional footballer
 Raich Carter (1914–1994), footballer and manager
 Nigel Clough (born 1966), former football player and manager
 Ralph Coates (1946–2010), former football player
 Kevin Dillon (English footballer) (born 1959), former football player and manager
 Randolph Galloway (1896–1964), former football player and manager of clubs like Valencia and Sporting Lisbon
 Michael Gray (born 1974), (footballer)
 Billy Hardy (born 1964), boxer who became Commonwealth featherweight champion
 Mick Harford (born 1959), former football player and manager
 Micky Hazard (born 1960), former football player 
 Jordan Henderson (born 1990), footballer Sunderland A.F.C, Liverpool F.C-Current and England national football team
 Jordan Pickford (born 1994), footballer Sunderland A.F.C, Everton F.C-Current and England national football team
 Robert William "Bob" Jefferson (born 1882), footballer
 Tony Jeffries (born 1985), boxer, Olympic Bronze medalist
 Ernie Johnson (born 1948), jockey who won the 1969 Epsom Derby
 Alan Kennedy: Footballer, Liverpool F.C. 
 Billy Marsden (born 1901), football player for England national football team
 Jimmy Montgomery (born 1943), former football player (goalkeeper) and 1973 FA Cup winner
 Bob Paisley Footballer, European Cup winning manager. 
 Alan Parnaby (1916–1974), cricketer and British Army officer
 Ross Pearson (born 1984), mixed martial artist in UFC
 Harry Potts (1920–1996), former football player and manager
 Giovanni Reyna (born 2002), footballer For BVB and USA National Team
 Lee Rushworth (born 1982), cricketer
 Jill Scott (born 1987), football player for England women's national football team and Manchester City L.F.C.
 Bob Willis (1949–2019), cricketer
 Stephanie Houghton (born 1988), football player for England women's national football team and Manchester City L.F.C.

Other
 Kate Adie, former BBC Chief News Reporter
 St Bede, monk
 Sir Joseph Swan, inventor of the incandescent light bulb
 George Binns, New Zealand chartist leader and poet
 St Benedict Biscop (628?–690)
 Abel Chapman (1851–1929), hunter and naturalist
 George Clarke, architect, television presenter
 James Watson Corder (1868–1953), historian of local family history
 Charlotte Crosby, television personality
 John Cryan, physicist and bank manager 
 Peter Gibbs, weather forecaster
 Jane Grigson, cookery writer
 Andreas Høivold, professional poker player
 Gareth Pugh (born 1981), fashion designer
 Denise Robertson, novelist and TV agony aunt
 Gordon Scurfield, biologist and author, active in Australia, with expertise in botany and ecology
 William Shanks, amateur mathematician, worked out the value of Pi to 707 decimals
 Chris Steele, TV doctor
 Ernest George Frederick Vogtherr (1898–1973), a New Zealand bacon curer, businessman and art collector

Notable residents 
 Charlie Buchan, footballer
 Lewis Carroll, author of Alice in Wonderland
 Frank Caws, architect
 Brian Clough, footballer, manager and European Cup winner
 Steve Cram, Olympic Athlete and TV presenter
 Bernard Gilpin, Apostle of the North, Rector of Houghton-le-Spring, Archdeacon of Durham
 Sir William Herschel, composer and astronomer, discoverer of Uranus
 Charlie Hurley, footballer
 Alex Kapranos, musician/singer
 Si King, television presenter, best known as one half of the Hairy Bikers
 L. S. Lowry, artist
 Lola Montez, adventuress
 Chris Mullin, civil liberties campaigner and Labour MP
 Jimmy Nail, actor/singer
 William Paley, rector of Bishopwearmouth, wrote on intelligent design as opposed to evolution
 Frank Pick, industrial designer
 Don Revie, footballer and England manager
 George Reynolds, businessman and former chairman of Darlington FC
 William Sancroft, later Archbishop of Canterbury, was briefly Rector of Houghton-le-Spring
 Len Shackleton, footballer
Michael Short, engineer and Professor
Peter Smith, computer scientist
 Niall Quinn, footballer
 Paul Gascoigne, footballer
 Jonathan Mark Watson, boxer
 Vivian Stanshall and his wife Ki Longfellow, found the Baltic Trader "Thekla" and sailed her to Bristol where she became the Old Profanity Showboat

References 

Sunderland
City of Sunderland